The 2015 Ottawa Fury FC season was the club's second season at the professional level in the North American Soccer League.

Club

Staff
Marc Dos Santos and other staff members would retain their positions from the previous season. Shortly after the conclusion of the 2014 season, the club announced the addition of longtime Chelsea academy coach Darko Buser to the club's management team.

Roster changes
On November 26, 2014, the club announced it would release four players; defenders Ramón Soria and Kenny Caceros, as well as forwards Pierre-Rudolph Mayard and Vini Dantas. On March 13, 2015 the club announced it and defender Omar Jarun had mutually parted ways.

Squad

Transfers

In

Out

Trial

Pre-season

Competitions

NASL Spring Season

Standings

Results summary

Results by round

Match reports

NASL Fall season

Standings

Results summary

Results by round

Match reports

NASL Combined Season

Standings

Results summary

Results by round

Soccer Bowl

Canadian Championship

Squad statistics

Appearances and goals

|-
|colspan="14"|Players who appeared for Ottawa but left during the season:

|}

Goal scorers

Disciplinary

Awards

Player

Club/Staff

References

Ottawa Fury Football Club
Ottawa Fury Football Club
Ottawa Fury FC seasons
Ottawa Fury